Ayacucho is the capital city of Ayacucho Region and of Huamanga Province, Ayacucho Region, Peru.

During the Inca Empire and Viceroyalty of Peru periods the city was known by the name of Huamanga (Quechua: Wamanga), and it continues to be the alternative name of the city.

The city's name was officially changed to Ayacucho after a major victory of the revolutionary army led by Bolívar's lieutenants against the royalists.

Simón Bolívar issued the decree on February 15, 1825, changing the name from "Huamanga" to "Ayacucho", referring to a major battle for independence that established once and for all the total independence of the nascent Peruvian Republic, as stated by Bolivar's decree, "Obtained the victory in... Huamanga, its name must be changed, in a way that perennially reminds those inhabitants the origin of their freedom." The name Ayacucho is derived from the Quechua words aya ("death" or "soul") and k'uchu ("corner") in honor of the battle's casualties.

Ayacucho is famous for its 33 churches, which represent one for each year of Jesus' life. Ayacucho has large religious celebrations, especially during the Holy Week of Easter. These celebrations include horse races featuring Peruvian Caballos de Paso and the traditional running of the bulls, known locally as the jalatoro or pascuatoro. The jalatoro is similar to the Spanish encierro, except that the bulls are led by horses of the Morochucos.

History
Vestiges of human settlements more than 15,000 years old have been found in the site of Pikimachay, about 25 km north of Ayacucho. From 500 to 900, the region became occupied by the Wari culture, which became known as the first expansionist empire based in the Andes before the Inca Empire.

The Ayacucho region was inhabited by varying indigenous cultures for thousands of years. During the Early Intermediate period (200 BC – 600 AD) the Nazca culture settled in the south-west, and the Warpa culture arose in the center of the Ayacucho region, the Wari Empire emerged as Huarpa cultures interacted with the nearby Nasca Culture at a time of intense interregional exchanges and widespread disruption to existing cultural traditions. During the Middle Horizon period (600 – 1000 AD), at its zenith the Wari state reigned over most of the highlands and coast of Peru, centered near the present-day city of Ayacucho (Huamanga), the Wari became the largest dominant culture in the Andes region before the Inca came into existence. The Wari civilization collapsed by about 1000 AD, the capital city of Wari was abandoned. With the end of the Wari culture, the Late Intermediate period (1000 AD – 1476 AD) is said to begin, while some post-Wari cultures continued to further develop during this era, particularly cultures from coastal Peru, the Late Intermediate era is marked by population decline and substantial cultural regression over extensive areas of the Peruvian highlands, the Ayacucho region became one of the most affected areas, urban planning ceased to be, people abandoned virtually all cities, if not all, and dispersed into rural hamlets. New tribal cultures — well differentiated from the old Wari — arose in the Ayacucho region, over time these became a series of relatively powerful warlike chiefdoms that controlled region, according to colonial chroniclers these tribes were united into a confederacy by the time Inca began to expand, referred in the Spanish accounts as the "Chanca confederacy", an alliance formed by the Chanca, Parinacocha, Vilca, Sora, and Rucana (Lucana) cultures, among other ayllu clans. After a series of fierce battles the Inca managed to defeat and conquer the Chanka confederacy and integrated the area into the Inca Empire, the Inca founded Vilcashuaman within Vilcas' culture territory, one of the most populous cities known to have existed in the Inca Empire, capital of the Inca province (wamani) of Vilcas. Huamanga was another of the administrative centers in the region, founded at a place called Pocra.

The Spanish colonial founding of Huamanga was led by conqueror Francisco Pizarro on April 25, 1540, who named it San Juan de la Frontera de Huamanga. Due to the constant Incan rebellion led by Manco Inca Yupanqui against the Spanish in the zone, Pizarro was quick to populate the settlement with a small number of Spaniards brought from Lima and Cusco. On May 17, 1544, by Royal decree, Ayacucho was titled La Muy Noble y Leal Ciudad de Huamanga (the most noble and loyal city of Huamanga), the highest designation in the Spanish hierarchy of naming cities. The city's main University was founded on July 3, 1677, as San Cristóbal of Huamanga University. Ayacucho was significant in the colonial era for being an administrative center, a stopping-off point between Lima and Cuzco, and the residence of mercury miner from Huancavelica, as well as local land owners.

On February 15, 1825, Simón Bolívar changed the city's name to Ayacucho, renaming it after the historical Battle of Ayacucho. Upon seeing so many casualties on the battlefield, citizens called the area Ayakuchu, aya meaning "dead" and kuchu meaning "corner" in Ayacucho Quechua. The Battle of Ayacucho was the last armed clash between the Spanish Army (formed mostly by Peruvian mestizos and indigenous peoples) and independentists  during the Peruvian War of Independence, and the independents' victory ensured independence. The battle developed in the nearby pampas of La Quinua on December 9, 1824. Independentist forces were led by Antonio José de Sucre, Simón Bolívar's lieutenant. Viceroy José de la Serna e Hinojosa was wounded, and after the battle second commander-in-chief José de Canterac signed the final capitulation of the Royalist army. The independent victory sealed the independence of Peru and South America. La Paz, now the seat of government of Bolivia, was similarly renamed La Paz de Ayacucho following this battle.

Although the city gained a new name and some fame, the economy declined following independence. There were attempts to revive the city's fortunes, with a planned railway link to Peru's network, but the line was terminated in Huancavelica.  A highway was subsequently constructed in 1968.  The city's economy is based on agriculture and light manufacturing, including textiles, pottery, leather goods, and filigree ware. It is a regional tourism destination, known for its 33 churches built in the colonial period, and for the nearby battlefield of La Quinua, where the Ayacucho battle was fought in 1824. The University of San Cristóbal was reopened in 1959. The city's population began to increase, but violent political unrest destabilized the region forced migration of many.

In 1980, the far-left terrorist organization known as the Shining Path (Sendero Luminoso) used Ayachucho as its base for its campaign against the Peruvian government, even staging an assault on the Ayacucho prison in 1982. The campaign faded after the leader Abimael Guzmán Reynoso was captured in 1992 and put in prison. The region headed by Ayacucho is rural and one of the poorest of all the country.  With the peace of the last 15 years, the citizens work hard to improve the living conditions and attract jobs.

Notable people from Ayacucho
 María Parado de Bellido, heroine in War of Independence.
 Efraín Morote Best, anthropologist and university president.
 Andrés Avelino Cáceres, President of Peru (1886–1890) and (1894–1895)
 Luis Guillermo Lumbreras, archaeologist.
 Alberto Arca Parró, economist and lawyer.
 Raúl García Zárate, guitarist.
Renata Flores Rivera, singer

See also
 Battle of Ayacucho

References

Further reading
 Gade, Daniel W. "Regional isolation of Ayacucho, a city in the Peruvian Andes." Yearbook of the Association of Pacific Coast Geographers 29.1 (1967): 111–119. excerpt

External links

 Ayacucho
 Ayacucho Travel Guide
 Video Documentary of Ayacucho
 Information about Ayacucho
 Handicrafts & Tourism Information in Ayacucho – Ayacucho Archaeo-Isotope Project 
 Music, news and more information about Ayacucho

Populated places established in 1540
Populated places in the Ayacucho Region
Cities in Peru
Regional capital cities in Peru